is a passenger railway station located in the city of Himeji, Japan, operated by West Japan Railway Company (JR West). Himeji is a major stop on the San'yō Main Line and the Sanyō Shinkansen, and the western end of the JR Kobe Line. The station building is located close to the Sanyo Electric Railway Himeji Station and Himeji Castle.

Lines

Station layout

The station has a complex layout of elevated platforms. The conventional trains operate from four island platforms, the first two of which have one dead-headed track each. The Shinkansen portion of the station has one side platform and one island platform with two passing trains between.

Platforms

Adjacent stations

History 
Himeji Station was opened by Sanyo Railway, the present-day San'yō Main Line, in 1888. At the time, railway stations were usually built either outside or alongside urban areas, but Himeji Station was built bordering the old city walls, at the end of the main street (Ootemae-dori). The current Sanyo Railway Station is actually constructed on top of part of the old city wall. It is thought that the reason was that the army was based in Himeji Castle. This proximity to the city helped to contribute to urban development.

Kishin Line was linked to the station in 1930.

The station was expanded with the opening of the Sanyo Shinkansen in 1972.

The preparation for elevation of the conventional lines has been undertaken since 1989, and begun in earnest in 1994 after the relocation of Himeji's freight terminal and train yards. On March 26, 2006, platforms for the JR Kobe Line and Sanyo Main Line switched to the elevated railway, while the remainder of the platforms, for the Bantan and Kishin Lines, were elevated beginning on December 22, 2008.

Timeline

 December 23, 1888: The Sanyo Railway segment between Akashi Station and Himeji Station opens.
 July 26, 1894: The Bantan Railway segment between Himeji Station and Teramae Station opens.
 June 1, 1903: Sanyo Railway purchases Bantan Railway.
 December 1, 1906: Sanyo Railway is nationalized.
 September 1, 1930: Kishin Line is connected.
 March 15, 1972: The Sanyo Shinkansen segment between Okayama and Shin-Osaka opens.
 April 1, 1987: Japanese National Railways is divided and privatized. The line is taken over by the West Japan Railway Company.
 January 17, 1995: There was a blockage of the segment of the Sanyō Shinkansen between Shin-Osaka and Himeji, caused by the Great Hanshin earthquake.
 April 8, 1995: The blocked section reopens.
 October 1, 2003: Nozomi service is added to the schedule.
 March 15, 2014: Mizuho service is added to the schedule.
 March 2018: Introduction of station numbering to the Kobe Line as Himeji was assigned station number JR-A85.

Passenger statistics
In fiscal 2016, the station was used by an average of 51,763 passengers daily (boarding passengers only).

See also
List of railway stations in Japan

References

External links

 JR West Station Official Site

Railway stations in Japan opened in 1888
JR Kobe Line
Railway stations in Himeji
Sanyō Main Line
Sanyō Shinkansen